The Studva is a river in eastern Croatia and northern Serbia, a 37 km-long right tributary to the Bosut river. It flows entirely within the Syrmia region of both Croatia and Serbia (Vojvodina).

The Studva originates from the marshes of the western Syrmia in Croatia (Spačva sub-region), near the village of Gunja. It is a slow, meandering river and spills over into several marshes as it flows by the villages of Đurići, Drenovci, Soljani and Vrbanja.

There is a canal from the Studva to the river Spačva.

At the medieval ruins of the town of Zvezdangrad, the Studva becomes a border river between Croatia and Serbia (total length as a border or Serbian river is 18 km). At the village of Morović the Studva empties into the Bosut river.

Just like the Bosut itself, the Studva is a satellite flow to the Sava river and uses the same, ancient (fossile) Sava's river bed. The river is navigable for 18 km for smaller vessels, drains an area of 355 km2 and belongs to the Black Sea drainage basin.

References

Rivers of Croatia
Rivers of Serbia
Geography of Vojvodina
Syrmia
International rivers of Europe
Croatia–Serbia border
Border rivers
Geography of Vukovar-Syrmia County